Tus or TUS may refer to:

 Tus (biology), a protein that binds to terminator sequences
 Thales Underwater Systems, an international defence contractor
 Tuscarora language, an Iroquoian language, ISO 639-3 code

Education
 Technological University of the Shannon, Ireland
 Tokyo University of Science, Japan

People
 Anton Tus (born 1931), retired Croatian general
 Christos Tusis (born 1986), Greek rapper

Places 
 Tampa Union Station, a train station in Florida, United States
 Tus, Iran, an ancient city in Razavi Khorasan
 Tus-e Olya, a village in Razavi Khorasan Province, Iran
 Tus-e Sofla, a village in Razavi Khorasan Province, Iran
 Tus Rural District, in Razavi Khorasan Province, Iran
 Tus citadel, a Sassanid-era citadel in Tus, Iran
 Río Tus, a river of Spain
 Tucson International Airport, Arizona, U.S.